Velikoretsky Lipovik is a rural locality (a village) in Komyansky Rural Settlement, Gryazovetsky District, Vologda Oblast, Russia. The population was 8 as of 2002.

Geography 
Velikoretsky Lipovik is located 46 km northeast of Gryazovets (the district's administrative centre) by road. Kiselevo is the nearest rural locality.

References 

Rural localities in Gryazovetsky District